Franz Josef Kupido  sometimes Cupido (6 August 1786, Brno- 17 December 1869) was a Czech entomologist principally interested in Lepidoptera.

Franz Josef Kupido was a Beamter. His collection is in the Moravian Museum, Brno. In 1825 Kupido described the autumn emperor moth, Perisomena caecigena.

References
Anonym 1852: [Kupido, F. J.] Lotos, Prag 2:243 
Anonym 1863: [Kupido, F. J.] Brünner Zeitung 1863  Nr. 292

1869 deaths
1786 births
Czech entomologists
Czech lepidopterists